National Democracy (also known from its abbreviation ND as Endecja) was a Polish political movement active from the second half of the 19th century under the foreign partitions of the country until the end of the Second Polish Republic. It ceased to exist after the German–Soviet invasion of Poland of 1939. In its long history, National Democracy went through several stages of development. Created with the intention of promoting the fight for Poland's sovereignty against the repressive imperial regimes, the movement acquired its right-wing nationalist character following the return to independence. A founder and principal ideologue was Roman Dmowski. Other ideological fathers of the movement included Zygmunt Balicki and Jan Ludwik Popławski.

The National Democracy's main stronghold was Greater Poland (western Poland), where much of the movement's early impetus derived from efforts to counter Imperial Germany's policy of Germanizing its Polish territorial holdings. Later, the ND's focus would shift to countering what it saw as Polish-Jewish economic competition with Catholic Poles. Party support was made up of the ethnically Polish intelligentsia, the urban lower-middle class, some elements of the greater middle class, and its extensive youth movement.

During the interbellum Second Republic, the ND was a strong proponent for the Polonization of the country's German minority and of other non-Polish (Belarusian, Lithuanian and Ukrainian) populations in Poland's eastern border regions (the Kresy). With the end of World War II and the occupation of the country by the Soviet Union and its communist puppet regime, the National Democracy movement effectively ceased to exist.

Origins 
The origins of the ND can be traced to the 1864 failure of the January 1863 Uprising and to the era of Positivism in Poland. After that Uprising – the last in a series of 19th-century Polish uprisings – had been bloodily crushed by Poland's partitioners, a new generation of Polish patriots and politicians concluded that Poland's independence would not be won through force on the battlefield, but through education and culture.

In 1886 the secret Polish League (Liga Polska) was founded. In 1893 it was renamed National League (Liga Narodowa). From 1895 the League published a newspaper, Przegląd Wszechpolski (The All-Polish Review), and from 1897 it had an official political party, the National-Democratic Party (Stronnictwo Narodowo-Demokratyczne). Unlike the Polish Socialist Party (PPS), the ND advocated peaceful negotiations, not armed resistance. Influenced by Roman Dmowski's radical nationalist and social-Darwinist ideas, National Democrats soon turned against other nationalities within the Polish lands, most notably the Jews; anti-Semitism became an element of ND ideology.

During World War I, while the PPS under Józef Piłsudski supported the Central Powers against Russia (through the Polish Legions), the ND first allied itself with the Russian Empire (supporting the creation of the Puławy Legion) and later with the Western Powers (supporting the Polish Blue Army in France). At war's end, many ND politicians enjoyed more influence abroad than in Poland. This allowed them to use their leverage to share power with Piłsudski, who had much more support in the military and in the country proper than they did. And because of their support abroad ND politicians such as Dmowski and Ignacy Paderewski were able to gain backing for their demands at the Paris Peace Conference of 1919 and in the Treaty of Versailles.

Second Republic 
In the newly independent Second Polish Republic, the ND was represented first by the Popular National Union (Związek Ludowo-Narodowy), a conservative political party advocating their program through democratic and parliamentary political means. After Piłsudski's May 1926 Coup d'État, the ND found itself in constant opposition to his Sanacja government. The tightening of Sanacja's controls on opposition parties and its general authoritarian drift led to the gradual radicalization of the ND movement. In December 1926, the Camp of Great Poland (Obóz Wielkiej Polski) was created as an extra-parliamentary organization in opposition to the Sanacja government. The youth faction of the Camp of Great Poland gradually took control over the whole organization, and from 1931 the camp quickly radicalized and even adopted some militaristic elements.

In 1928 the National Party (Stronnictwo Narodowe) was founded, as a successor party to the Popular National Union. In the beginning, the new party adopted the same political line as its predecessor. After the official banning of the Camp of Great Poland, radicalized youth entered the National Party. The ideological clash between the old and new generation of National Democrats culminated at the party convention in 1935 where the younger activists were elected to lead the party. In 1936–1939 the personnel changes within the party continued, and the young generation totally began its complete domination. The older generation of National Democrats, disagreeing with the new course, left active politics or exited the party completely. A chief characteristic of ND policies at this time was their emphasis on Polonization of minorities:  ND politicians such as Dmowski and Stanisław Grabski contributed to the failure of Piłsudski's proposed Międzymorze federation and the alliance with the Ukrainian leader Symon Petlura, as well as to the alienation of Poland's ethnic minorities.

Simultaneously the ND emphasized its anti-Semitic stance, intending to exclude Jews from Polish social and economic life and ultimately to push them to emigration out of Poland. Antisemitic actions and incidents – boycotts, demonstrations, even attacks – organized or inspired by National Democrats occurred during the 1930s. The most notorious actions were taken by a splinter group of radical young former NDs who formed the fascist-inspired National Radical Camp (Obóz Narodowo-Radykalny).

World War II 
During World War II, the ND became part of a coalition which formed the Polish Government in Exile. It was closely linked with the National Armed Forces (Narodowe Siły Zbrojne), an underground organization that became part of the Polish resistance movement. ND armed organizations fought not only against Nazi Germany but also against the Soviet Union. Both occupying forces regarded members of the movement as their mortal enemy, and its leaders were hunted down and killed in mass executions, in concentration camps, and in the Katyń massacre. Among those killed are:
 Leopold Bieńkowski (father of Zygmunt Witymir Bieńkowski), arrested by the NKVD in early 1940, died in a Soviet concentration camp near Arkhangelsk in 1941
 reverend Feliks Bolt, a senator of the Republic of Poland, died in Stutthof in 1940
 Tadeusz Fabiani, a lawyer, shot at Pawiak in 1940
 Stanisław Głąbiński, died in NKVD prison in Lubyanka in 1940
 doctor Wincenty Harembski, shot in NKVD prison in Kharkiv in 1940
 Tadeusz Zygmunt Hernes, journalist, killed in Katyń massacre
 Czesław Jóźwiak, murdered by the Gestapo in 1940 in Dresden prison
 Jan Mosdorf, Auschwitz
 reverend Marceli Nowakowski, shot in Warsaw in December 1939
 Stanisław Piasecki, writer, shot in Palmiry in June 1941
 reverend Józef Prądzyński, died in the Dachau concentration camp in 1942
 Jozefat Sikorski, murdered by the Gestapo in the Berlin-Plotzensee prison in 1942
 Michał Starczewski, murdered in the Katyn massacre
 Tadeusz Szefer, murdered in the Katyn massacre
 Jan Szturmowski, murdered by the Germans in September 1939
 Jan Waliński, murdered by the NKVD in Kharkiv in 1940
 Antoni Wolniewicz, murdered by the Gestapo in the Berlin-Plotzensee prison in 1942
 Jan Wujastyk, murdered in the Katyń massacre

Righteous among the Nations 
 Edward Kemnitz
 Marceli Godlewski

After the war 
After the war, when a communist, pro-Soviet government took power in Poland, most remaining NDs either emigrated to the West or continued to oppose the Communist regime. Others joined the new regime – most notably, the RNR-Falanga leader Bolesław Piasecki, who co-organized a Catholic movement.

Today's Poland 
Since the fall of communism, with Poland once again a democratically governed country, several political parties have sought to re-establish some ND traditions; their adherents prefer to call themselves the "National Movement" (Ruch Narodowy). The only significant party that declared itself a successor to the ND was the League of Polish Families (Liga Polskich Rodzin), founded in 2001 by Roman Giertych, grandson of Jędrzej Giertych, a pre-war ND politician. It received 8% of the parliamentary vote in 2001 and 16% in 2004, but then fell below the 5% threshold in 2007 and lost all its parliamentary seats.

Another Polish national-democratic association with legal standing is the Camp of Great Poland. The association was established on March 28, 2003, as a response of the National Party (Stronnictwo Narodowe; SN) Youth Section to the deletion of the party from the national registry. On February 17, 2012, the OWP was registered in the National Registrar of Companies and Legal Entities (Krajowy Rejestr Sądowy; KRS), gaining legal personality.

Today the main party promoting National Democracy is the National Movement. The party was formed originally as a nationalist coalition by Robert Winnicki, Krzysztof Bosak, and other defectors from the LPR. As of 2019, it has 5 deputies in the Sejm.

Newspaper Nasz Dziennik often represents national democracy viewpoints.

Notables 
 Zygmunt Balicki
 Ignacy Chrzanowski
 Roman Dmowski
 Adam Doboszyński
 Jędrzej Giertych
 Stanisław Grabski
 Władysław Grabski
 Józef Haller
 Feliks Koneczny
 Władysław Konopczyński
 Wojciech Korfanty
 Stanisław Kozicki
 Leon Mirecki
 Jan Mosdorf
 Jan Ludwik Popławski
 Roman Rybarski
 Marian Seyda
 Józef Świeżyński
 Zygmunt Wasilewski
 Maurycy Zamoyski

See also 
 Camp of Great Poland
 Camp of Great Poland (association)
 National Radical Camp (1934)
 Conservative-Monarchist Club

Notes

References

External links 
 Digital Library of National Thought (Polish)

Further reading 
 
 
 
 
 
 
 
 
 
 
 
 
Wizerunek endeka ratującego Żydów był komunistom nie na rękę

 
Conservatism in Poland
Catholic political parties